Hadımköy is a station on the Istanbul Metrobus Bus rapid transit line. It is located on the D.100 state highway, with entrances/exits on both sides of the road.

Hadımköy station was opened on 19 July 2012 as part of the westward expansion of the line.

References

External links
Hadımköy station
Hadımköy in Google Street View

Istanbul Metrobus stations
2012 establishments in Turkey
Beylikdüzü